Edward Walton Berlin (born January 14, 1978), is a former American football wide receiver. He was originally drafted by the Tennessee Titans in the fifth round of the 2001 NFL Draft out of the University of Northern Iowa. He played for the Chicago Bears in 2005.

High school years
Berlin was born in Urbandale, Iowa, where he attended Urbandale High School and won varsity letters in football, baseball, and track. In baseball, he was a two-time All-State honoree.  He has a younger brother, Tommy, who also played football and went to Northern Iowa.

College career
Berlin attended University of Northern Iowa and was selected a Division I-AA All-American in 2000.

Coaching career
Berlin served as Assistant Coach at Grand View College from 2007 through 2009.

References

1978 births
Living people
People from Urbandale, Iowa
Players of American football from Iowa
American football wide receivers
Northern Iowa Panthers football players
Tennessee Titans players
Chicago Bears players
Grand View Vikings football coaches